Anton Friedrich Wilhelm von Webern (3 December 188315 September 1945), better known as Anton Webern, was an Austrian composer and conductor whose music was among the most radical of its milieu in its sheer concision, even aphorism, and steadfast embrace of then novel atonal and twelve-tone techniques. With his mentor Arnold Schoenberg and his colleague Alban Berg, Webern was at the core of those within the broader circle of the Second Viennese School.

Little known in the earlier part of his life, mostly as a student and follower of Schoenberg, but also as a peripatetic and often unhappy theater music director with a mixed reputation as an exacting conductor, Webern came to some prominence and increasingly high regard as a vocal coach, choirmaster, conductor, and teacher during Red Vienna. With Schoenberg away at the Prussian Academy of Arts (and with the benefit of a publication agreement secured through Universal Edition), Webern began writing music of increasing confidence, independence, and scale during the latter half of the 1920s—his mature chamber and orchestral works, music that, perhaps more than his earlier expressionist works, would later decisively influence a generation of composers. Amid Austrofascism, Nazism, and World War II, Webern remained nevertheless committed to taking the "path to the new music", as he styled it in a series of private lectures delivered in 1932–1933 (but unpublished until 1960). He continued writing some of his most mature and later celebrated music while increasingly ostracized from official musical life as a "cultural Bolshevist", taking occasional copyist jobs from his publisher as he lost students and his conducting career.

Following his death shortly after World War II, Webern became more widely celebrated and influential than ever before, albeit initially through pedagogy often lacking full context, and the thread of his work was taken by composers in directions far beyond any residual post-Romanticism and expressionism that had remained in his style. His gradual innovations in schematic organization of pitch, rhythm, register, timbre, dynamics, articulation, and melodic contour; his later adaptation and generalization of imitative contrapuntal techniques such as canon and fugue; and his inclination toward athematicism, abstraction, and lyricism variously informed and oriented European, typically serial or avant-garde composers such as Olivier Messiaen, Pierre Boulez, Karlheinz Stockhausen, Luigi Nono, Bruno Maderna, Henri Pousseur, Bernd Alois Zimmermann, and György Ligeti. Later, both Brian Ferneyhough and Helmut Lachenmann also found much in Webern on the way to complexity in the case of the former and musique concrète instrumentale in the case of the latter, engaging particularly with his atonal works by some contrast to earlier post-Webernism. Less so in the United States, his music attracted the interest of Elliott Carter and Aaron Copland, whose critical ambivalence was marked by a certain enthusiasm and fascination nonetheless; Milton Babbitt, who ultimately derived more inspiration from Schoenberg's twelve-tone practice than that of Webern; and particularly Igor Stravinsky, to whom it was very fruitfully reintroduced by Robert Craft, and without which Stravinsky's late works might have taken different shape. Indeed, Stravinsky staked his contract with Columbia Records to see that Webern's "complete" music was first both recorded and widely distributed. Among the more interdisciplinary New York School, John Cage and Morton Feldman both cited the staggering effect of its sound on their own music, first meeting at a performance of the Symphony, Op. 21, and even singing the praises of Christian Wolff distinctly as "our Webern". A richer and more historically informed understanding of Webern and his music began to emerge during the latter half of the 20th century onward in the work of Kathryn Bailey Puffett, Allen Forte, Julian Johnson, Felix Meyer, and Anne Shreffler as archivists, biographers, and musicologists, most importantly Hans and Rosaleen Moldenhauer, gained access to sketches, letters, lectures, audio recordings, and other articles of or associated with Webern's estate.

Biography

1883–1918: Youth, education, and war in Austria-Hungary 

Webern was born in Vienna, then in Austria-Hungary.

He lived in Graz and Klagenfurt for much of his youth. But his distinct and lasting sense of Heimat was shaped by readings of Peter Rosegger; and moreover by frequent and extended retreats with his parents, sisters, and cousins to his family's country estate, the Preglhof, which Webern's father had inherited upon the death of Webern's grandfather in 1889.

Webern memorialized the Preglhof in a diary poem "An der Preglhof" and in the tone poem Im Sommerwind (1904), both after Bruno Wille's idyll. Once Webern's father sold the estate in 1912, Webern referred to it nostalgically as a "lost paradise". He continued to revisit the Preglhof, the family grave at the cemetery in Schwabegg, and the surrounding landscape for the rest of his life; and he clearly associated the area, which he took as his home, very closely with the memory of his mother Amelie, who had died in 1906 and whose loss also profoundly affected Webern for decades.

In 1902, Webern began attending classes at Vienna University. There he studied musicology with Guido Adler, writing his thesis on the Choralis Constantinus of Heinrich Isaac. This interest in early music would greatly influence his compositional technique in later years, especially in terms of his use of palindromic form on both the micro- and macro-scale and the economical use of musical materials.

Webern's cousin Ernst Dietz, an art historian studying in Graz, may have introduced Webern to the work of the painters Arnold Böcklin and Giovanni Segantini, whom Webern came to admire. Segantini's work was a likely inspiration for Webern's 1905 single-movement string quartet.

Young Webern was enthusiastic about the music of Ludwig van Beethoven, Franz Liszt, Wolfgang Amadeus Mozart, Franz Schubert ("so genuinely Viennese"), Hugo Wolf, and Richard Wagner, visiting Bayreuth in 1902. He also enjoyed the music of Hector Berlioz and Georges Bizet. In 1903, besides describing some of Alexander Scriabin's music as "languishing junk," Webern wrote of Robert Schumann's Symphony No. 4 that it was "boring," that Carl Maria von Weber's Konzertstück in F minor was passé, and that he found Johannes Brahms's Symphony No. 3 (which struck Eduard Hanslick as "artistically the most nearly perfect") "cold and without particular inspiration, ... badly orchestrated—grey on grey." Writing about an all-Russian concert program, Webern praised one of Alexander Glazunov's symphonies as "not particularly Russian" in contrast to some of Nikolai Rimsky-Korsakov's music, of which he thought less.

In 1904, he approached Hans Pfitzner for composition lessons but left angrily after hearing criticism of Gustav Mahler and Richard Strauss. It may have been at Guido Adler's advice that he paid Schoenberg for composition lessons. Webern progressed quickly under Schoenberg's tutelage, publishing his Passacaglia, Op. 1, as his graduation piece in 1908. He also met Berg, then another of Schoenberg's pupils. These two relationships would be the most important in his life in shaping his own musical direction.

With the help of friends and colleagues, especially Alexander Zemlinsky, Webern later began working peripatetically as a conductor and musical coach in various towns and cities, among them Ischl, Teplitz (now Teplice, Czech Republic), Danzig (now Gdańsk, Poland), Stettin (now Szczecin, Poland), and Prague. He conducted some of Debussy's music in 1911, having written rapturously to Schoenberg about Claude Debussy's opera Pelléas et Mélisande in 1908. But Webern returned to Vienna, specifically Mödling, to be happier near Schoenberg, despite Schoenberg's and his own father's advice that he not leave his theater post in Prague. In 1912, he suffered a breakdown and undertook a course of psychoanalysis with Alfred Adler into 1913, who noted his idealism and perfectionism in diagnosing his symptoms as psychogenic responses to failure, resistance, or unfulfilled expectations, a diagnosis that Webern accepted, found insightful, and shared with Schoenberg.

1918–1934: Rise in Red Vienna 

From 1918 to 1921, Webern helped organize and operate the Society for Private Musical Performances, which gave concerts of then recent or new music by Béla Bartók, Berg, Ferruccio Busoni, Debussy, Erich Wolfgang Korngold, Mahler, Maurice Ravel, Max Reger, Erik Satie, Strauss, Stravinsky, and Webern himself. After their Society performances in 1919 (and while working on his own Opp. 14–15), Webern wrote to Berg that Stravinsky's Berceuses du chat "[move] me completely beyond belief," describing them as "indescribably touching," and that Stravinsky's Pribaoutki were "something really glorious"; like the Berceuses du chat, Webern's subsequent Five Canons, Op. 16, were only several measures long each and scored for vocalist accompanied by clarinets (or in the case of Nos. 2 and 4, a clarinet).

His performances in this capacity were aired on Österreichischer Rundfunk no fewer than twenty times starting in 1927.

In 1926, Webern had noted his voluntary resignation as chorusmaster of the Mödling , a paid position, in controversy over his hiring of a Jewish singer, Greta Wilheim, to replace a sick one. Letters document their correspondence in many subsequent years, and she (among others) would in turn provide him with facilities to teach private lessons as a convenience to Webern, his family, and his students.

Webern's music began to be performed more widely during and after the 1920s, yet he found no great success such as Berg enjoyed with Wozzeck nor even as Schoenberg did, to a lesser extent, with Pierrot lunaire or in time with Verklärte Nacht. His Symphony, Op. 21, was performed in New York through the League of Composers in 1929 and again in Oxford at the ninth festival of the International Society for Contemporary Music (ISCM). He was awarded Music Prize of the City of Vienna, served as Vienna ISCM President (1933–1938, 1945), and furthered a closer working friendship with Krenek, alongside whom he lectured, whose music (taking a twelve-tone turn) he conducted, and with whom both Berg and he shared certain affinities during what was again becoming an increasingly difficult time. Though in 1928 Berg celebrated the "lasting works" and successes of composers "whose point of departure was ... late Mahler, Reger, and Debussy and whose temporary end point is in ... Schoenberg" in their rise from "pitiful 'cliques'" to a large, diverse, international, and "irresistible movement," they became increasingly marginalized and ostracized in Central Europe with few exceptions. In private lectures delivered 1932–1933, Webern attacked Nazi cultural policies in strong terms, asking "What will come of our struggle?" and warning "Imagine what will be destroyed, wiped out, by this hate of culture!" Writing before his suicide in 1942, Stefan Zweig reflected, "the short decade between 1924 and 1933, from the end of German inflation to Hitler's seizure of power, represents—in spite of all—an intermission in the catastrophic sequence of events whose witnesses and victims our generation has been since 1914."

1933–1938: Austrofascism and Anschluss 

Webern's music, along with that of Berg, Krenek, Schoenberg, and others, was denounced as cultural Bolshevism and proscribed as Entartete Kunst by the Nazi Party in Germany, and its publication and performance were forbidden, although neither did it fare well under Austrofascism. An Austrian gauleiter on Bayerischer Rundfunk labeled both Berg and Webern as Jewish composers in 1933, although Berg wrote to Adorno of prior instances. Amid the rise of fascism in the 1930s, both found it harder to earn a living; Webern lost a promising conducting career which might have otherwise been more noted and recorded and had to take on work as an editor and proofreader for his publishers, UE. The last performances of Webern's music in Vienna were Peter Stadlen's 1937 premières of the Piano Variations.

Violinist Louis Krasner described Webern as naive and idealistic but not entirely without his wits, shame, or conscience, contextualizing Webern as a member of Austrian society at the time, one departed by Schoenberg and one in which the already pro-Nazi Vienna Philharmonic had even refused to play the late Berg's Violin Concerto. Krasner was particularly troubled by a 1936 conversation with Webern about the Jews, in which Webern expressed his vague, possibly anti-Semitic opinion that "Even Schoenberg, had he not been a Jew, would have been quite different!" Krasner remembered that "Jews ... were at the center of the difficulty. Those who wanted to, put the blame for all this calamity, for all this depraved condition, on the Jews who had brought it with them—along with a lot of radical ideas—from the East. People blamed the Jews for their financial worries. The Jews were, at the same time, the poverty-stricken people who came with nothing, and the capitalists who controlled everything."

When the Nazis invaded Austria, Krasner was visiting Webern in Maria Enzersdorf; Webern, uncannily seeming to anticipate the timing down to 4 o'clock in the afternoon, turned on the radio to hear this news and immediately warned Krasner, urging him to flee, whereupon he did (first to Vienna). Whether this was for Krasner's safety or to save Webern the embarrassment of Krasner's presence during a time of possible celebration in the pro-Nazi Webern family (or indeed in most of pro-Nazi Mödling, by Krasner's description as well as one even more vivid of Arnold Greissle-Schönberg), Krasner was ambivalent and uncertain, withholding judgment. Krasner revisited frequently, hoping to convince friends (e.g., Schoenberg's daughter Gertrude and her husband Felix Greissle) to emigrate before time ran out. Krasner eventually left more permanently, after a 1941 incident wherein he felt only his US passport saved him from both locals and police. Only later did Krasner himself realize how self-admittedly "foolhardy" he had been and in what danger he had placed himself, revealing an ignorance perhaps shared by Webern, who wrote to Humplik and Jone on the day of the Anschluss to be left alone: "I am totally immersed in my work [composing] and cannot, cannot be disturbed." Krasner's presence could have been a disturbance to Webern for this reason, and Bailey Puffett speculates that this may be why he was rushed off by Webern.

1938–1945: German Reich, Kristallnacht, and World War II 

Webern's attitude towards Nazism has been variously described. This may reflect Webern's own vacillations, ambivalence, or cognitive dissonance no less than the different contexts in which, or the audiences to whom, his views were expressed: a very wide variety of differences were represented in his friends, family, and colleagues, from active members of the Nazi Party within his family to the Zionist Schoenberg, who emigrated; the left-leaning Berg, who died in 1935; and others of their Social Democratic milieu in previously "red" Vienna, most of whom were targeted and fled. Nazism itself, "not a coherent doctrine or body of systemically interrelated ideas, but rather a vaguer worldview made up of a number of prejudices with varied appeals to different audiences which could scarcely be dignified with the term 'ideology,'" has been variously described.

There is, moreover, political complexity to complicate Webern's individual culpability. After World War I, the center-left Social Democrats had governed with the right-wing Social Christians in increasingly tenuous coalition, with the emergence of paramilitaries and disorder culminating in civil war. As a matter of Realpolitik and self-determination, prominent Austromarxists Otto Bauer and Karl Renner, among other Social Democrats, endured in their support of a German-Austrian Anschluss, unanimously passed by the Provisional National Assembly in 1918 as an answer to the Grossdeutsche Lösung before the peace treaty-imposed post-Habsburg rump state ("ce qui reste, c'est l'Autriche"). With their party outlawed and some members interned under Austrofascism, some Social Democrats, at least initially, viewed National Socialists as no worse than what had become of Social Christians, merged by Engelbert Dollfuss into the clericofascist Vaterländische Front in concert with appeals to Austrians' Catholic identity and imperial history in order to maintain independence of Nazi Germany through alliance with Fascist Italy and Hungary; thus Bauer, Renner, and others supported the Anschluss referendum even under Nazi occupation following years of deteriorating German-Austrian relations and Austrian weakening, including the failed Austrian Nazi coup d'état and continuing economic warfare and destruction of infrastructure. Likewise, as an expression more of pan-nationalism and populism than frank Nazism, many Austrians hoped for post-Anschluss political stability and prosperity. Bailey Puffett wrote that Webern may well have hoped to be able again to conduct and to be better able to secure a future for his family under a new regime that proclaimed itself "socialist" no less than nationalist.

In broad terms, Webern's attitude seems to have first warmed to a degree of characteristic fervor and later, in conjunction with widespread German disillusionment, cooled to Hitler and the Nazis to such an extent that by 1945 he had resolved to emigrate to England. On 2 May 1940, Webern had described Hitler as "this unique man" who created "the new state" of Germany. But while Alex Ross thus characterizes him as "an unashamed Hitler enthusiast," Bailey-Puffett and the Moldenhauers contextualize these passages not only with reference to Webern's nationalism, but also as patriotic wartime letters to Joseph Hueber, an active soldier, baritone, mountaineering companion, and close friend who held such views and sent Webern gifts from service abroad.

Following , Webern visited and aided Jewish colleagues DJ Bach, Josef Polnauer, and Hugo Winter. For Jokl, a former Berg pupil, Webern wrote a letter of recommendation to facilitate emigration; when that failed, Webern served as his godfather in a 1939 baptism.

Webern's financial situation deteriorated until, by August 1940, his personal records reflected no monthly income. He attended the 1943 Winterthur première of his Op. 30 only with the diplomatic intervention and financial support of Werner Reinhart, its dedicatee. 

Webern's 1944–1945 correspondence is strewn with references to bombings, deaths, destruction, privation, and the disintegration of local order; but also noted are the births of several grandchildren. At the age of sixty (i.e., in Dec. 1943), Webern wrote that he was living in a barrack away from home and working from 6 am to 5 pm, compelled by the state in a time of war to serve as an air-raid protection police officer. On 3 March 1945, news was relayed to Webern that his only son, Peter, died on 14 February of wounds suffered in a strafing attack on a military train two days earlier.

Toward the end of the war, the Weberns provided Schoenberg's first son Görgi and his family, who emigration Schoenberg was also unable to secure despite many attempts, food and shelter in a Mödling apartment belonging to their son-in-law. With the Red Army approaching, the Weberns fled on foot to Mittersill, about 75 km. away; there, Amalie, one of Webern's daughters, wrote of "17 persons pressed together in the smallest possible space." Görgi and his family stayed behind for their safety, but due to the Nazi munitions and propaganda in the apartment's storeroom, Görgi was held and nearly executed as a Nazi spy when he was discovered. He was able to convince a Jewish, German-speaking officer that he was not, drawing attention to his clothes, sewn with the yellow Star of David. Görgi and his family continued to live in this apartment with this family until 1969.

1945: Allied-administered Austria 

On 15 September 1945, following the arrest of his son-in-law for black-market activities, Webern was smoking a cigar outside his home so as not to disturb his sleeping grandchildren about one hour before curfew when he was shot and killed by US Army cook PFC Raymond Norwood Bell of North Carolina, who, overcome by remorse, died of alcoholism in 1955.

Webern's wife Wilhelmine "Minna" Mörtl was buried with him when she died in 1949. Her last years were marred by grief, illness, loneliness (as friends and family continued to emigrate), and continuing poverty and consequent embarrassment. News of performances abroad made her wish that Webern had lived to experience more successes, and her grief was compounded by the lack of commemoration in Vienna: she asked Jone in 1948, "Should Anton have already been forgotten? Or is it the fault of the dreadful time in which we live?" In 1947 she wrote to Dietz, who had emigrated to the US, that "during the summer of 1945 [Webern] became convinced that he could not live here [in Austria] any more. He was firmly resolved to go to England and he would have carried it out, too"; likewise, in 1946, she wrote to DJ Bach, who had emigrated to London: "How difficult the last eight years had been for him. [He] was so embittered that he had only the one wish: to flee from this country. But one was caught, without a will of one's own. ... It was close to the limit of endurance what we had to suffer."

Music 

Webern's works are concise, distilled, and select; when Boulez, for a second time, recorded all of his then published compositions, including some of those without opus numbers, the results fit on just six CDs. Not all of his works were or could be published in his lifetime, especially after 1934. His music is often considered inaccessible by listeners and difficult by performers alike; Babbitt observed that during Webern's life it "was regarded (to the very limited extent that it was regarded at all) as the ultimate in hermetic, specialized, and idiosyncratic composition." Though his œuvre comprises stylistic shifts, it is typified by spartan textures, in which every note can be heard; carefully chosen timbres, often resulting in very detailed instructions to the performers and use of extended instrumental techniques (flutter tonguing, col legno, and so on); wide-ranging melodic lines, often with leaps greater than an octave or more; and brevity: the Six Bagatelles for string quartet, Op. 9, (1913), for instance, last about three minutes in total. The concerns and techniques of his music were cohesive, interrelated, and only very gradually transformed with the overlap of old and new, particularly in the case of his middle-period lieder (for example, his first use of twelve-tone technique in Op. 17, Nos. 2 and 3, was not especially stylistically significant and only eventually became realized as otherwise so in later works).

A very general feature of Webern's music, as much of Schoenberg's, is a predilection toward the use of minor seconds, major sevenths, and minor ninths, as noted with some insight in 1934 by microtonalist Alois Hába, writing of his and his students' affinities with Schoenberg in particular, and later by both Valentina Kholopova and Yuri Kholopov in formulations more specific to Webern and with a more unifying emphasis on the semitone in the context of axial inversional symmetry and octave equivalence (i.e., interval class 1, or ic1), approaching Allen Forte's more generalizing pitch-class set analysis. Webern's consistent and distinctive use of ic1 in particular within small subsets of other intervals, sometimes derived from a given twelve-tone row in his later practice, was well noted. Webern often musically expresses ic1 as a major seventh, minor ninth, or even wider interval. Webern's intervallic practices may be more globally understood as the outcome of an inversionally symmetrical treatment of pitch in a manner comparable to other modernists, including Berg, Bartók, Debussy, Schoenberg, and Stravinsky, or more nascently even Mahler, Bruckner, Liszt, and Wagner, but often far more strictly and increasingly in schemes with other parameters (e.g., fixed or "frozen" register, the association of articulations and dynamics with specific pitches).

1899–1908: Formative juvenilia and emergence from study 

Webern published little of his early work in particular; like Brahms, Webern was meticulous and revised extensively. Many juvenilia remained unknown until the work and findings of the Moldenhauers in the 1960s, effectively obscuring and undermining formative facets of Webern's musical identity. Thus when Boulez first oversaw a project to record "all" of Webern's music, not including the juvenilia, the results fit on three rather than six CDs.

Webern's earliest works consist primarily of lieder, the genre that most testifies to his roots in Romanticism, specifically German Romanticism; one in which the music yields brief but explicit, potent, and spoken meaning manifested only latently or programmatically in purely instrumental genres; one marked by significant intimacy and lyricism; and one which often associates nature, especially landscapes, with themes of homesickness, solace, wistful yearning, distance, utopia, and belonging. Robert Schumann's "Mondnacht" is an iconic example; Joseph Freiherr von Eichendorff, whose lyric poetry inspired it, is not far removed from the poets (e.g., Richard Dehmel, Gustav Falke, Theodor Storm) whose work inspired Webern and his contemporaries Berg, Reger, Schoenberg, Strauss, Wolf, and Zemlinsky. Wolf's Mörike-Lieder were especially influential on Webern's efforts from this period. But well beyond these lieder alone, all of Webern's music may be said to possess such concerns and qualities, as is evident from his sketches, albeit in an increasingly symbolic, abstract, spare, introverted, and idealized manner.

Webern's first piece after completing his studies with Schoenberg was the Passacaglia for orchestra (1908), Op. 1. Harmonically, it is a step forward into a more advanced language, and the orchestration is somewhat more distinctive than his earlier orchestral work. However, it bears little relation to the fully mature works he is best known for today. One element that is typical is the form itself: the passacaglia is a form which dates back to the 17th century, and a distinguishing feature of Webern's later work was to be the use of traditional compositional techniques (especially canons) and forms (the Symphony, the Concerto, the String Trio, and String Quartet, and the piano and orchestral Variations) in a modern harmonic and melodic language.

1908–1924: Atonality, aphorism, and lieder 
Webern wrote freely atonal music somewhat in the style of Schoenberg starting with Op. 3. The two were so close in their artistic development that in 1951 Schoenberg reflected that he had sometimes no longer known who he was. But Webern did not merely follow Schoenberg. Ethan Haimo noted the swift, radical influence in summer 1909 of Webern's novel and arresting Fünf Sätze for string quartet, Op. 5, on Schoenberg's subsequent Klavierstück Op. 11, No. 3 (which differs markedly from Op. 11, Nos. 1 and 2 of February 1909); Fünf Orchesterstücke for orchestra, Op. 16; and monodrama Erwartung, Op. 17. In 1949 Schoenberg still remembered being "intoxicated by the enthusiasm of having freed music from the shackles of tonality" and believing with his pupils "that now music could renounce motivic features and remain coherent and comprehensible nonetheless".

With Opp. 18–20, Schoenberg began to retreat somewhat. With its contrapuntal procedures and nonstandard ensemble, Pierrot was received by Webern as a direction for the composition of his own Opp. 14–16.

Of some fifty-six songs on which Webern worked during and after World War I (1914–1926), he ultimately finished and later published only thirty-two, carefully ordered into sets as Opp. 12–19. "How much I owe to your Pierrot", he wrote Schoenberg upon completing a setting of Georg Trakl's "Abendland III", Op. 14, No. 4, in which, distinctly, there is no silence or rest until a pause at the concluding gesture. A recurring theme is that of the wanderer, estranged or lost and seeking return to or at least retrieval from an earlier time and place. This wartime theme of wandering in search of home or rest fits with two complex, interrelated concerns more broadly evident in Webern's work: first, the loss and memory of his mother, father, and nephew, usually from a religious perspective; and second, Webern's broad and spiritual, even pantheistic sense of Heimat in the form of abstracted and idealized rural landscapes, such as that of the lost Preglhof esate or the Alps. In a stage play he wrote in October 1913, Tot, Webern drew on Emanuel Swedenborg's notion of correspondence to explore these concerns over the course of six alpine scenes of reflection and self-consolation.

Johnson argues that the whole of Webern's music takes on the nature of such dramatic and visual tableaux, if in a more abstract and formal manner in some of the late works. Melodies frequently begin and end on weak beats, settle into or arise out of ostinati, or otherwise dynamically and texturally emerge or fade away. Expanding on the orchestration of Mahler, Webern characteristically sought a colorful and novel but idiosyncratically fragile and intimate sound, not infrequently bordering on silence at a typical , often in consistent association with certain lyrical topics, whether the female or an angelic voice as evoked by solo violin or the use of harmonics; luminosity or darkness as sought by different voicings or the use of sul ponticello; absence, emptiness, or loneliness metaphorically through compressed range by contrast to fulfillment or (often spiritual) presence through registral expansion; the celestial and ethereal in the use of celesta, harp, glockenspiel; or angels and heaven, for example, in the use of harp and trumpet in the circling ostinati of Op. 6, No. 5, and winding to conclusion at the very end of Op. 15, No. 5).

For Webern especially, text-setting became a means of composing more than atonal aphorisms, but Schoenberg sought other means, "long ... yearning for a style for large forms ... to give personal things an objective, general form." From as early as 1906 Berg, Schoenberg, and Webern indulged a shared interest in esotericism, Swedenborgian mysticism, and Theosophy, reading Honoré de Balzac (Louis Lambert and Séraphîta) and August Strindberg (Till Damaskus and Jacob lutte) as they explored ways forward in their own work. Gabriel, the protagonist of Schoenberg's semi-autobiographical Die Jakobsleiter (1914–1922, rev. 1944) begins by describing a journey: "whether right, whether left, forwards or backwards, uphill or down – one must keep on going without asking what lies ahead or behind." Webern interpreted this line as a metaphor for pitch space, as did Schoenberg, who later considered Jakobsleiter a "real twelve-tone composition" for its opening hexachordal ostinato and a "Scherzo [theme] ... which accidentally consisted of all the twelve tones," well aware that "[a]n historian will probably one day find ... how enthusiastic [Webern and I] were about this." On the journey to composition with twelve tones, Webern revised many of his middle-period  in the years after their apparent composition but before publication, increasingly prioritizing clarity of pitch relations, even against timbral effects, as Anne Shreffler and Felix Meyer have described.

1924–1945: Formal coherence and expansion 

With the Drei Volkstexte (1925), Op. 17, Webern used Schoenberg's twelve-tone technique for the first time, and all his subsequent works used this technique. The String Trio (1926–1927), Op. 20, was both the first purely instrumental work using the twelve-tone technique (the other pieces were songs) and the first cast in a traditional musical form.

Like that of both Brahms and Schoenberg, Webern's music is marked by its emphasis on counterpoint and formal considerations, and his commitment to systematic pitch organization in the twelve-tone method is inseparable from this prior commitment. His tone rows are often arranged to take advantage of internal symmetries: a row may be divided into four groups of three pitches which are variations, such as inversions and retrogrades, of each other, thus creating invariance. This gives Webern's work considerable motivic unity, although this is often obscured by the fragmentation of the melodic lines. This fragmentation occurs through octave displacement (using intervals greater than an octave) and by moving the line rapidly from instrument to instrument in a technique referred to as Klangfarbenmelodie.

Webern's late cantatas seem to indicate new developments in style, which Webern himself noted ecstatically in letters to the Humpliks, or at least a thoroughgoing synthesis of the formal rigors of his mature instrumental works with the word painting of his lieder on a larger, orchestral scale. They are texturally somewhat denser and more homophonic at the surface through nonetheless contrapuntal polyphonic means, with "Schweigt auch die Welt" culminating in a twelve-tone simultaneity.

An apparent third cantata (1944–1945), setting "Das Sonnenlicht spricht" from Jone's Lumen cycle, was left in his sketchbook, having been planned initially as a concerto.

Arrangements and orchestrations 

In his youth (1903), Webern orchestrated at least five of Franz Schubert's various lieder, giving the piano accompaniment to an appropriately Schubertian orchestra of strings and pairs of flutes, oboes, clarinets, bassoons, and horns: "Der Vollmond Strahlt auf Bergeshöhn" (the Romanze from Rosamunde), "Tränenregen" (from Die schöne Müllerin), "Der Wegweiser" (from Winterreise), "Du bist die Ruh", and "Ihr Bild"; in 1934, he did the same for Schubert's six Deutsche Tänze (German Dances) of 1824.

For Schoenberg's Society for Private Musical Performances in 1921, Webern arranged, among other things, the 1888 Schatz-Walzer (Treasure Waltz) of Johann Strauss II's Der Zigeunerbaron (The Gypsy Baron) for string quartet, harmonium, and piano.

In 1924, Webern arranged Franz Liszt's Arbeiterchor (Workers' Chorus, c. 1847–1848) for bass solo, mixed chorus, and large orchestra; it was premièred for the first time in any form on 13 and 14 March 1925, with Webern conducting the first full-length concert of the Austrian Association of Workers Choir. A review in the Amtliche Wiener Zeitung (28 March 1925) read "neu in jedem Sinne, frisch, unverbraucht, durch ihn zieht die Jugend, die Freude" ("new in every respect, fresh, vital, pervaded by youth and joy"). The text, in English translation, reads in part: "Let us have the adorned spades and scoops,/ Come along all, who wield a sword or pen,/ Come here ye, industrious, brave and strong/ All who create things great or small." Liszt, initially inspired by his revolutionary countrymen, had left it in manuscript at publisher 's discretion.

Performance style 

Webern insisted on lyricism, nuance, rubato, sensitivity, and both emotional and intellectual understanding in performance of music; this is evidenced by anecdotes, correspondence, extant recordings of Schubert's Deutsche Tänze (arr. Webern) and Berg's Violin Concerto under his direction, many such detailed markings in his scores (including a specially marked score of the Piano Variations), and finally by his compositional process as both publicly stated and later revealed in the musical and extramusical metaphors and associations everywhere throughout his sketches. As both a composer and conductor, he was one of many (e.g., Wilhelm Furtwängler, Dimitri Mitropoulos, Hermann Scherchen) in a contemporaneous tradition of conscientiously and non-literally handling notated musical figures, phrases, and even entire scores so as to maximize expressivity in performance and to cultivate audience engagement and understanding.
	
This aspect of Webern's work had been typically missed in his immediate post-war reception, however, even as it may radically affect the music's reception. Felix Galimir of the Galimir Quartet told The New York Times in 1981: "Berg asked for enormous correctness in the performance of his music. But the moment this was achieved, he asked for a very Romanticized treatment. Webern, you know, was also terribly Romantic—as a person, and when he conducted. Everything was almost over-sentimentalized. It was entirely different from what we have been led to believe today. His music should be played very freely, very emotionally."

Reception, influence, and legacy 

In 1947, Schoenberg remembered and expressed solidarity with Berg and Webern despite rumors of the latter's having "fallen into the Nazi trap": "Let us—for the moment at least—forget all that might have at one time divided us. For there remains for our future what could only have begun to be realized posthumously: One will have to consider us three—Berg, Schoenberg, and Webern—as a unity, a oneness, because we believed in ideals, once perceived, with intensity and selfless devotion; nor would we ever have been deterred from them, even if those who tried might have succeeded in confounding us." Krasner notes that this "puts 'Vienna's Three Modern Classicists' into historical perspective," summarizing it as "what bound us together was our idealism."

In part because he had largely remained obscure and arcane during his own lifetime, interest in Webern's music increased in the aftermath of World War II as it came to represent a universally or generally valid, systematic, and compellingly logical model of new composition, with his  acquiring "a saintly, visionary aura". This was made possible in large part by René Leibowitz as he championed, performed, promulgated, and published Schoenberg et son école, but Theodor W. Adorno and others also contributed. When Webern's Piano Variations were performed at Darmstadt in 1948, young composers listened in a quasi-religious trance. In 1955, the second issue of Eimert and Stockhausen's journal Die Reihe was devoted to Webern's œuvre, and in 1960 his lectures were published by UE.

It has been suggested that post-war composers' fascination with Webern's music was enabled by its apparent simplicity and concision facilitating musical analysis. Gottfried Michael Koenig speculates on the basis of his personal experience that since Webern's scores represented such a highly concentrated source, they may have been considered the better for didactic purposes than those of other composers.  criticized the approach of early serialists to Webern's music as reductive and narrowly focused on some of Webern's apparent methods rather than on his music more generally, especially neglecting timbre in their typical selection of Opp. 27–28. Karel Goeyvaerts recalled that at least on first impression, the sound of Webern's music reminded him of "a Mondrian canvas," explaining that "things of which I had acquired an extremely intimate knowledge, came across as crude and unfinished when seen in reality." Expressing a related opinion, contemporaneous German music critic and contributor to Die Reihe Wolf-Eberhard von Lewinski wrote in the Darmstädter Tagblatt (3 September 1959) that some of the later and more radical music at Darmstadt was "acoustically absurd [if] visually amusing"; several days later, one of his articles in the Der Kurier was similarly headlined "Meager modern music—only interesting to look at."

Significantly as relates to his reception, Stravinsky noted that Webern never compromised his artistic identity and values.

Somewhat independently and singularly, identifying with Webern as a "solitary soul" amid 1940s wartime fascism, Luigi Dallapiccola found inspiration especially in Webern's lesser-known middle-period lieder, blending elements of bel canto, Viennese expressionism, and the ethereal qualities of Webern's music in his 1943 Sex carmina alcaei, dedicated "with humility and devotion" to "the Master," with whom he met in 1942 through Schlee, coming away initially open-mouthed at Webern's emphasis then on tradition, specifically "our great Central European tradition." His 1953 Goethe-Lieder especially recall Webern's Op. 16 in style. He was so stunned by Op. 24 at its 1935 ISCM festival world première under Heinrich Jalowetz in Prague that he left the concert early with "food for thought" and an impression of the work's "aesthetic and stylistic unity on which one could not wish to improve." A later work, Dialoghi (1959–1960), testifies to his intimate familiarity with not only with Webern's procedures and works in particular, but also those of Schoenberg.

Well into and beyond the 1960s, Webern's work continued to influence musicians even as far removed as Joel Thome and Frank Zappa, yet many post-war European musicians and scholars had already begun to look beyond as much as back at Webern: there was some rapprochement with Berg and advocacy for more engagement with the expressionism of Webern's atonal works in contrast to some earlier post-Webernism. In Adorno's 1954 lecture "The Aging of the New Music," he claimed that in the prevailing climate "artists like Berg or Webern would hardly be able to make it"; against the "static idea of music" and "total rationalization" of the "pointillist constructivists," he advocated for more subjectivity, citing Über das Geistige in der Kunst (1911), in which Wassily Kandinsky wrote: "Schoenberg's [expressionist] music leads us to where musical experience is a matter not of the ear, but of the soul—and from this point begins the music of the future." Even as the first scene of Pousseur's Votre Faust (1960–1968) quotes the opening of "Schweigt auch die Welt," dramatizing the composer Henri's analysis of Webern's Op. 31, it already has several elements of late or postmodernism, with its extreme plurality of historically developed styles, mobile form, and polyvalent roles in the service of a self-reflexive theme of relative, unstable identity (traces perhaps of Berg, whose example Pousseur cites, from whose music he quotes in the second scene, and whose writings he translated into French in the 1950s). Boulez was "thrilled" by Berg's "universe ... never completed, always in expansion—a world so ... inexhaustible," referring to the rigorously organized, only partly twelve-tone Chamber Concerto and echoing Adorno's praise for Lulu, the première of which Boulez conducted in 1979 after its finished orchestration by Friedrich Cerha. Both Ferneyhough and Lachenmann sympathetically expanded upon and poetically went further than Webern in attention to the smallest of details and the use of ever more radically extended techniques: for example, Ferneyhough's 1967 Sonatas for string quartet comprise not only serial, but also atonal sections much in the style of Webern's Op. 9 yet more intensely sustained; and Lachenmann wrote in the 1985 essay, "Hearing [Hören] is Defenseless—without Listening [Hören]," of "a melody made of a single note [...] in the viola part" in mm. 2–4 of Webern's Op. 10, No. 4, amid "the mere ruins of the traditional linguistic context," in a comparison to his own 1969 Air, in which even "the pure tone, now living in tonal exile, has in this new context no aesthetic advantage over pure noise."

In the Communist Bloc, the music of the Second Viennese School proved an often bewildering or professionally dangerous but sometimes exciting or inspiring alternative to socialist realist art music, given access. Whereas Berg's Lyric Suite, performed by the Kolisch Quartet at the 1927 Baden-Baden ISCM festival where Bartók performed his own Piano Sonata, could inspire Bartók in his subsequent third and fourth string quartets and later Concerto for Orchestra, Second Viennese influence on composers behind the Iron Curtain was mediated by anti-fascist and anti-German sentiment and obstructed by anti-formalist cultural policies and Cold War separation more generally. In 1970 Ligeti explained, "In countries where there exists a certain isolation, in Eastern Europe, one cannot obtain correct information. One is cut off from the circulation of blood." Following the 1956 uprising in Hungary, the influence of Webern initially predominated, bearing on Pál Kadosa, Endre Szervánszky, and György Kurtág.

In Soviet Russia specifically, as official condemnation and restricted access eased somewhat with the repeal of anti-formalist resolutions amid the post-Stalinist Khrushchev Thaw in the late 1950s and early 1960s, modernist and avant-garde scores and recordings entered through family (e.g., the relationship between Sergei Slonimsky and Nicolas Slonimsky), friends, journalists, composers, and especially musicians (e.g., Igor Blazhkov, Gérard Frémy, Alexei Lubimov, Maria Yudina) as they traveled more. Kholopov risked arrest for obtaining scores from West Berlin and the Leipzig office of Schott Music while stationed nearby in Zossen as a military band arranger (1955–1958). Philip Herschkowitz, poverty-stricken, had been teaching privately with cautious emphasis on Beethoven and the tradition from which Webern emerged, while in Soviet Music Marcel Rubin criticized "Webern and His Followers" (1959), by contrast to Berg and Schoenberg, precisely for going too far; and Alfred Schnittke complained in an open letter (1961) of composers' restricted education. Through Grigory Shneyerson's anti-formalist On Music Living and Dead (1960) and Johannes Paul Thilman's anti-modernist "On the Dodecaphonic Method of Composition" (1958), many (e.g., Eduard Artemyev, Vladimir Martynov, Boris Tischenko, Viktor Yekimovsky) ironically learned more about what had been and even was still forbidden. Lydia Davydova recalled that through Andrei Volkonsky "Russia heard the music of the Renaissance and the early Baroque for the first time. He also had scores that his relatives sent him from abroad and also records sent by his relatives. You could say the same about modern music, because at his apartment I heard for the first time Schoenberg—Pierrot Lunaire—and the Webern cantatas." Tischenko similarly remembered: "Precisely he, precisely in the 1960s, discovered the regularity of the music that he composed. He was the first swallow of the avant-garde. And those who came after him ... they already followed in his tracks. I consider A. Volkonsky the discoverer." Edison Denisov described the 1960s as his "second conservatory" and also credited Volkonsky not only for introducing the likes of Webern and his followers, but also of Carlo Gesualdo. This tolerance did not survive Brezhnev and the Stagnation: Volkonsky emigrated in 1973, Herschkowitz in 1987, and of Khrennikov's Seven (1979), Denisov, Elena Firsova, Sofia Gubaidulina, Dmitri Smirnov, and Viktor Suslin eventually emigrated.

Webern's music remains polarizing and provocative within various communities of musicians and scholars. Its legacy (or canonic status) has been celebrated, confirmed, and challenged with recourse or reference to culture, history, ideology, philosophy, politics, social context, and public opinion or audience reception as a critical basis, ranging from the earlier interdisciplinary aesthetics and sociomusicology of Adorno and Ernst Bloch to the New Musicology of Susan McClary and more adjacently Richard Taruskin in the US. Complementing formal musical analysis, which itself was enriched by David Lewin's work toward a more integrative and phenomenological approach, Julian Johnson worked toward a hermeneutics of Webern's music, building on the middle-period lieder sketch studies of Felix Meyer and Anne Shreffler as well as the work of the Moldenhauers. Since the "Restoration of the 1980s," as Martin Kaltenecker termed a paradigm shift from structure more toward perception within the discourse of New Music, challenges have been raised within historical musicology, prompting controversy and admonishments: Charles Rosen scorned a "kind of historical criticism ... avoiding any serious engagement with a work or style that one happens not to like"; Andreas Holzer warned of "the spread of post-factual tendencies in musicology"; and Pamela M. Potter cautioned that "[i]t is important to consider all the scholarship on musical life in the Third Reich that, taken together, reveals the complexity of the day-to-day existence of musicians and composers", as "[i]t seems inevitable that debates about the political culpability of individuals will persist, especially if the stakes remain so high for composers, for whom an up or down vote can determine inclusion in the canon." Though noted for his polemicism, Taruskin's work on New Music since and including the Second Viennese School in particular was criticized not only by Holzer and Rosen, but also by Max Erwin, Larson Powell, and particularly Franklin Cox, who faulted him as an unreliable historian and "ideologist of tonal restoration," arguing that his "reactionary historicist" project opposed the Second Viennese School's "progressivist historicist" emancipation of the dissonance. Taruskin himself admitted to having acquired a "dubious reputation" on the Second Viennese School and noted that he was described as "coming, like Shakespeare's Marc Anthony, 'to bury Webern, not to praise him'". In relation to post-Webernism more generally, Holzer warned of attempts "to place Darmstadt in a fascistoid corner or even identifying it as a US propaganda institution amid the Cold War" through "unbelievable distortions, exaggerations, reductions and propagation of clichés".

Recordings by Webern 
 Webern conducts "Berg – Violin Concerto" 
 Webern conducts his arrangement of Schubert's German Dances

Notes

References

Bibliography

Further reading 
 Ahrend, Thomas, and Stefan Münnich. 2018. Anton Webern. Oxford Bibliographies in Music. Oxford University Press. .{{subscription
 Ahrend, Thomas, and Matthias Schmidt (eds.). 2015. Der junge Webern. Texte und Kontexte. Webern-Studien. Beihefte der Anton Webern Gesamtausgabe 2b. Wien: Lafite. .
 Ahrend, Thomas, and Matthias Schmidt (eds.). 2016. Webern-Philologien. Webern-Studien. Beihefte der Anton Webern Gesamtausgabe 3. Wien: Lafite. .
 Cavallotti, Pietro, and Simon Obert, and Rainer Schmusch (eds.). 2019. Neue Perspektiven. Anton Webern und das Komponieren im 20. Jahrhundert. Webern-Studien. Beihefte der Anton Webern Gesamtausgabe 4. Wien: Lafite. .
 Ewen, David. 1971. "Anton Webern (1883–1945)". In Composers of Tomorrow's Music, by David Ewen, 66–77. New York: Dodd, Mead & Co. .
 Galliari, Alain. 2007. "Anton von Webern". Paris: Fayard. .
 Kröpfl, Monika, and Simon Obert (eds.). 2015. Der junge Webern. Künstlerische Orientierungen in Wien nach 1900. Webern-Studien. Beihefte der Anton Webern Gesamtausgabe 2a. Wien: Lafite. .
 Mead, Andrew. 1993. "Webern, Tradition, and 'Composing with Twelve Tones'". Music Theory Spectrum 15(2):173–204. 
 
 Moldenhauer, Hans. 1966. Anton von Webern Perspectives. Ed. Demar Irvine, with an introductory interview with Igor Stravinsky. Seattle: University of Washington Press.
 Noller, Joachim. 1990. "Bedeutungsstrukturen: zu Anton Weberns 'alpinen' Programmen". Neue Zeitschrift für Musik 151(9):12–18.
 Obert, Simon (ed.). 2012. Wechselnde Erscheinung. Sechs Perspektiven auf Anton Weberns sechste Bagatelle. Webern-Studien. Beihefte der Anton Webern Gesamtausgabe 1. Wien: Lafite. .
 Perle, George. 1991. Serial Composition and Atonality: An Introduction to the Music of Schoenberg, Berg and Webern. Sixth ed. Berkeley and Los Angeles: University of California Press.
 Rockwell, John. 1983. All American Music: Composition in the Late Twentieth Century. New York: Alfred Knopf. Reprinted New York: Da Capo Press, 1997. , .
 Tsang, Lee. 2002. "The Atonal Music of Anton Webern (1998) by Allen Forte". Music Analysis 21(3): 417–427.
 Wildgans, Friedrich. 1966. Anton Webern. Trans. Edith Temple Roberts and Humphrey Searle. Intro. and notes by Humphrey Searle. New York: October House.

External links 
 
 
 Anton Webern Gesamtausgabe (Complete Edition)

1883 births
1945 deaths
Austrian Roman Catholics
20th-century classical composers
Deaths by firearm in Austria
Expressionist music
Twelve-tone and serial composers
Second Viennese School
University of Vienna alumni
Composers from Vienna
Accidental deaths in Austria
Pupils of Arnold Schoenberg
Austrian male classical composers
Austrian classical composers
String quartet composers
20th-century Austrian composers
20th-century Austrian male musicians
Firearm accident victims